The 2015 season marks Glamorgan County Cricket Club's 128th year of existence and its 94th as a first-class cricket county. In 2015, Glamorgan is playing in the Second Division of the County Championship, Group B of the 50-over Royal London One-Day Cup and the South Group of the NatWest t20 Blast. It is the second season in charge for head coach Toby Radford. The club captain is overseas player Jacques Rudolph. Unlike other counties, Glamorgan is competing in limited-overs cricket without a nickname for the third year in a row.

Squad
 No. denotes the player's squad number, as worn on the back of their shirt.
  denotes players with international caps.
  denotes a player who has been awarded a county cap.
 Ages given as of the first day of the County Championship season, 12 April 2015.

County Championship

Royal London One-Day Cup

NatWest t20 Blast

Pre-season friendlies

Statistics

Batting

Bowling

References

External links
Glamorgan home at ESPNcricinfo

2015
2015 in English cricket
2015 in Welsh sport
Welsh cricket in the 21st century
Seasons in Welsh cricket